Ko Vaya is a census-designated place (CDP) in Pima County, Arizona, United States. The population was 46 at the 2010 census.

Geography
Drysdale is located at  (32.081502, −111.895875).

Demographics

As of the 2010 census, there were 46 people living in the CDP: 24 male and 22 female. 15 were 19 years old or younger, 7 were ages 20–34, 10 were between the ages of 35 and 49, 10 were between 50 and 64, and the remaining 4 were aged 65 and above. The median age was 36.5 years.

The racial makeup of the CDP was 84.8% American Indian, 10.9% White, 2.2% Other, and 2.2% two or more races.  10.9% of the population were Hispanic or Latino of any race.

There were 15 households in the CDP, 12 family households (80%) and 3 non-family households (20%), with an average household size of 3.07. Of the family households, 5 were married couples living together, while there were 4 single fathers and 5 single mothers; the non-family households were all males living alone.

The CDP contained 16 housing units, of which 15 were occupied and 1 was vacant.

References

Census-designated places in Pima County, Arizona